The 1973 Monaco Grand Prix was a Formula One motor race held at Monaco on 3 June 1973. It was race 6 of 15 in both the 1973 World Championship of Drivers and the 1973 International Cup for Formula One Manufacturers.

The race was held on a heavily revised circuit, with a longer tunnel, a new section of track around the new swimming pool on the harbour front, and the Gasworks hairpin replaced by the Rascasse and Antony Noghès corners, the latter named after the founder of the race. The pits were also moved back to the start-finish straight, on a wider pit lane.

The 78-lap race was won from pole position by Scotland's Jackie Stewart, driving a Tyrrell-Ford. In the process, Stewart equalled the record of 25 Grand Prix victories set by his friend Jim Clark. Brazil's Emerson Fittipaldi finished second in a Lotus-Ford, with Swedish teammate Ronnie Peterson third.

This was the first race for future World Champion James Hunt, driving a March-Ford entered by Hesketh Racing. Hunt suffered an engine failure in the closing stages of the race, but was classified ninth.

Qualifying

Qualifying classification

Race

Classification

Championship standings after the race

Drivers' Championship standings

Constructors' Championship standings

References

Monaco Grand Prix
Monaco Grand Prix
Grand Prix